1,2-Dioxin is a heterocyclic, organic, antiaromatic compound with the chemical formula CHO. It is an isomeric form of 1,4-dioxin (or p-dioxin).

Due to its peroxide-like characteristics, 1,2-dioxin is very unstable and has not been isolated. Calculations suggest that it would isomerize rapidly into but-2-enedial. Even substituted derivatives are very labile, e.g. 1,4-diphenyl-2,3-benzodioxin. Indeed, in 1990, 3,6-bis(p-tolyl)-1,2-dioxin was wrongly accounted as the first stable derivative. It was subsequently shown that the initial compound was not a derivative of 1,2-dioxin, but a thermodynamically more stable dione.

References 

Dioxins
Hypothetical chemical compounds
Antiaromatic compounds